Tom Intondi was an American singer-songwriter first based in Greenwich Village and later in the Northwest. Intondi recorded three solo albums, and toured and recorded with a collaboration called The Song Project that also included Lucy Kaplansky, Frank Christian, and Martha P. Hogan.

Intondi died of cancer in 1994. Two years later, friend, Frank Rossini compiled a set of recordings from performances (both solo and with other artists) and released a disc titled, Tom Intondi Live!.

Discography
 City Dancer (1976, City Dancer)
 House of Water (1983, City Dancer)
 Bringin' up the Sun (1992, City Dancer)
 Tom Intondi Live! (1996, City Dancer)

See also
 The Song Project (1985) – a collaboration with Lucy Kaplansky, Frank Christian, and Martha P. Hogan
 Fast Folk Musical Magazine

References

1994 deaths
American singer-songwriters
American male singer-songwriters
Fast Folk artists
Year of birth missing